Gitanas Nausėda (born 19 May 1964) is a Lithuanian economist, politician and banker who is serving as the ninth and incumbent President of Lithuania since 2019. He was previously director of monetary policy at the Bank of Lithuania from 1996 until 2000 and chief economist to the chairman of SEB bankas from 2008 until 2018. Nausėda ran as an independent in the 2019 presidential election, which he won with over 66% of the vote in the runoff.

Early life and education
From 1982 to 1987 he studied in Vilnius University, Faculty of Industrial Economics and from 1987 to 1989 in the Faculty of Economics.

From 1990 to 1992 he did a practice at the University of Mannheim in Germany under the DAAD scholarship.
He defended his PhD thesis "Income Policy Under Inflation and Stagflation" in 1993. Since 2009 he is an associate professor at Vilnius University Business School.

Professional and political career
Having completed his studies, from 1992 to 1993 he worked for the Research Institute for Economics and Privatization.
From 1993 to 1994 he worked for the Lithuanian Competition Council as a head of the Financial Markets Department.
From 1994 to 2000 he worked at the Bank of Lithuania, initially in the department regulating the commercial banks and later as a director of the Monetary Policy Department.
From 2000 to 2008 he was a chief economist and adviser to the chairman of AB Vilniaus Bankas.
From 2008 to 2018 he was the financial analyst as well as chief adviser and later the chief economist for the SEB bankas president.

In 2004, he supported the election campaign of the former Lithuanian president Valdas Adamkus.

Presidency (2019–present)

On 17 September 2018, Nausėda announced his candidacy for the 2019 Lithuanian presidential election. He finished just 2,000 votes behind former Finance Minister Ingrida Šimonytė in the first round, and defeated her in the runoff with 66 percent of the vote.

He was officially inaugurated on 12 July. Nausėda presented acting Prime Minister Saulius Skvernelis's candidacy to continue his duties on 18 July. By the time he had spent a month in office, Nausėda was considered to be the most trusted politician in Lithuania according to polls conducted by the Lithuanian National Radio and Television (LRT).

Foreign policy

Belarus 
In April 2020, President Nausėda and Belarusian President Alexander Lukashenko had their nations' first presidential tête-à-tête in 10 years. Following the Lukashenko government's crackdown on protesters after the disputed 2020 Belarusian presidential elections (which were widely regarded as unfree and unfair) and the resulting protests, Belarusian opposition candidate Svetlana Tikhanovskaya fled to Lithuania. Nausėda's leadership during the crisis has been noted for being one that augmented Lithuania's role among European Union nations. On 12 August, he ordered that Lithuania open its borders to all Belarusians for humanitarian purposes. That day, he also presented a plan on the settlement of the crisis, being supported by Latvia and Poland, which consisted of three points that included a call for the creation of a national council from the Belarusian Government and civilian society. In an interview with Sky News on 13 August, he declared Lukashenko as "no longer the legitimate leader".

Nausėda has been critical of the safety of the Astravets Nuclear Power Plant in Belarus. In May 2020, during a conference call with Armenian Premier Nikol Pashinyan, he called on Armenia to share its experience with the Armenian Nuclear Power Plant to Belarus over concerns over the Astravets Nuclear Power Plant.

On 23 May 2021, in the immediate aftermath of the hijacking of Ryanair flight 4578, where two journalists outspoken against the Lukashenko regime in Belarus were arrested, Nausėda called for EU recognition of Belarusian airspace as “unsafe for civilian aviation” and the immediate release of the arrested journalist Roman Protasevich. By the evening of May 23 Nausėda has secured the support of both the leaders of Latvia and Estonia in recognising Belarusian airspace as unsafe to enter.

Poland 
Nausėda has made multiple efforts to engage in better relations with Poland, being seen as a personal ally of the Polish leadership. On 16 July, four days after his inauguration, he visited Warsaw to meet with President Andrzej Duda in his first foreign visit as president. During the visit, there were calls for him to establish a more personal relationship with the country. He also rejected any attempt by European Union leaders to sanction Poland for its actions in relation to the Supreme Court of Poland and the rest of the country's judiciary. On 22 November, Nausėda and Duda, as well as the First Lady of Poland Agata Kornhauser-Duda participated in the state funeral of commanders and participants in the 1863–1864 uprising against Tsarist rule in Vilnius. During his visit to Vilnius, Duda highlighted the Central European nations' unity importance for their independence. In January 2020, Nausėda joined Duda in pulling out of 5th World Holocaust Forum, who criticized the event for giving the speaking slot to Russian president Putin, who has himself criticized Poland's WWII history by engaging in a historical revisionist campaign.

Russia 
During a meeting in Berlin with German Chancellor Angela Merkel in August, Nausėda urged her to maintain sanctions against Russia. In an interview with LRT on 14 August, he reiterated past positions that a potential meeting with Russian President Vladimir Putin would be "pointless" due to the fact that Lithuania sees "the true danger" and "risks" of being on the border with Russia.

On 24 February 2022, Nausėda has strongly condemned the 2022 Russian invasion of Ukraine and called for heavy sanctions on Russia. 

In March 2023, he accused China of supporting Russia, saying that "the aim of China is to continue this war, to make this war even more bloody".

Ukraine 

In November 2019, he referred to the Steinmeier formula suggested by Ukrainian President Volodymyr Zelensky as a solution to the Russo-Ukrainian War as being "more profitable for Russia than Ukraine".

On 23 February 2022, a day before the 2022 Russian invasion of Ukraine, President Nausėda together with his Polish counterpart Andrzej Duda visited Zelensky in Kyiv to express solidarity and support. During the visit, Nausėda said: "In the face of Russian aggression, Ukraine will not be left alone... We will support Ukraine with all possible means." Following the invasion, Nausėda called for military, economic and humanitarian aid for Ukraine.

Taiwan 
In January 2022, Nausėda criticized the government's creation of a de facto embassy of Taiwan with the inclusion of "Taiwanese" in the name, an act interpreted by the People's Republic of China as a breach of the One-China policy and resulted in a degradation in political and economic relationships. The President clarified that while he does not object to the opening of the embassy, he was not consulted on the naming decision.

Relations with the Šimonytė Government 
During the 2020 parliamentary elections Ingrida Šimonytė, former opponent of Nausėda in the 2019 presidential election, was elected to the position of prime minister. He publicly broke with the government's decision to create a defacto embassy of Taiwan bearing the country's name in the title.

International trips as president

Nausėda has welcomed many foreign leaders and dignitaries to Lithuania since taking office, including Latvian President Egils Levits, Polish President Andrzej Duda, Ukrainian President Volodymyr Zelensky and Canadian Governor-General Julie Payette.

Personal life
Nausėda's father, Antanas Nausėda (1929-2022), was an engineer. His mother Stasė Nausėdienė (1931–2014) was a physics and mathematics teacher from the village of Lazdininkai. His sister Vilija (born 1959) is an economist. In 1990, he married Diana Nausėdienė. They have two daughters. In addition to his native Lithuanian, Gitanas Nausėda speaks German, English and Russian. Since 1997, he has been collecting antique books.

Controversies

Private house in a regional park 
Environmentalists have criticized Gitanas Nausėda for building a modern private household in Pavilniai Regional Park, nearby Pūčkoriai exposure—a unique geological object declared to be a nature monument in 1974. Then-advisor for SEB bankas, Nausėda replied by stating that he had acquired a legal permit for such a construction to take place here. The Directorate of the Pavilniai Regional Park tried to fight back against this ruling, but to no avail. "It's a shame that people till this day can't admit being wrong and that the court had acknowledged this as well. That time I showed good will and did not demand the court to ask money from them for a lawsuit that lasted for 2–3 years. But it seems people don't get that", Nausėda reacted. According to the director of the Directorate of the Pavilniai Regional Park Vida Petiukonienė, even though experts had confirmed that the permit to construct a modern house in the park is not in accordance with the law, the court had ordered to reconcile the project. "This is the reality of life, this is how things work in this world, we can only feel sorry. The situation we are in is one of those ridiculous instances, a mockery of the country, laws, and people who go to work in order to commit to these laws. In other words, us", Petiukonienė has commented.

Book "Whistleblower and President" 
In 2023, investigative journalists - Dovydas Pancerovas and Birutė Davidonytė released book titled "Whistleblower and President" which revealed information about Nausėda's presidential campaign previously unreported funding and his relationship with business groups.

Honours

National honours
: Medal of Merit to Neringa's Municipality (2016)
: Grand Master and Grand Cross with Golden Chain of the Order of Vytautas the Great (12 July 2019)

Foreign honours
 : Order of the Star of Romania (2022)
 : Grand Cordon of the Order of Leopold (24 October 2022)
 : Order of Prince Yaroslav the Wise, 1st class (23 August 2021)

Honorary doctorates
: Gifu University (24 October 2019)

References

External links

1964 births
Living people
Lithuanian economists
Politicians from Klaipėda
Vilnius University alumni
Presidents of Lithuania
Independent politicians in Lithuania
Recipients of the Order of Prince Yaroslav the Wise, 1st class